Johann Philipp Breyne FRS (9 August 1680, Danzig (Gdańsk), Royal Prussia (a fief of the Crown of Poland) – 12 December 1764, Danzig, Royal Prussia), son of Jacob Breyne (1637–97), was a German-Polish botanist, palaeontologist, zoologist and entomologist. He is best known for his work on the Polish cochineal (Porphyrophora polonica), an insect formerly used in production of red dye. Proposed by Hans Sloane, he was elected, on 21 April 1703, a Fellow of the Royal Society. He was also a member of the German Academy of Sciences Leopoldina (after 1715) and the Societas Litteraria (after 1720)

Works
 De Plantis & Insectis Quibusdam Rarioribus in Hispania Observatis, In: Philosophical Transactions. Bd. 24, S. 2044–2055, 1704/1705 
 Epistola D. J. Phil. Breynij, M. D. Gedanensis, & Reg. Societ. Lond. Sodal. ad D. Hans Sloane, M. D. Dictoe Societatis Secretarium; Varias Observationes Continens, in Itinere per Italiam Suscepto, Anno 1703. Bd. 17, S. 447–459, 1710/1712
 Dissertatiuncula de Agno Vegetabili Scythico, Borametz Vulgo Dicto, In: Philosophical Transactions. Bd. 33, S. 353–360, 1724/1725 
 Observatio de Succinea Gleba, Plantae Cujusdam Folio Impraegnata, Rarissima, Bd. 34, S. 154–156, 1725/1726 
 Historia naturalis Cocci Radicum Tinctorii quod polonicum vulgo audit (Danzig, 1731)
 Some Corrections and Amendments by J. P. Breynius, M.D. F.R.S. concerning the Generation of the Insect Called by Him Coccus Radicum, in His Natural History Thereof, Printed in the Year 1731..., In: Philosophical Transactions Bd. 37, S. 444–447, 1731/1732
A Letter from John Phil. Breyne, M. D. F. R. S. to Sir Hans Sloane, Bart. Pres. R. S. with Observations, and a Description of Some Mammoth's Bones Dug up in Siberia, Proving Them to Have Belonged to Elephants, In: Philosophical Transactions Bd. 40, S. 124–138, 1737
Prodromi fasciculi rariorum plantarum primus et secundus... (1739) – Aus dem Nachlass seines Vaters
 Observatio de Immodico & Funesto Lapidum Cancrorum, Similiumque Terrestrium Absorbentium Usu, Indeque Ortis Calculis in Ventriculo & Renibus, In: Philosophical Transactions Bd. 41, S. 557–559, 1739/1741 (with Hans Sloane)

External links 
 Gaedike, R.; Groll, E. K. & Taeger, A. 2012: Bibliography of the entomological literature from the beginning until 1863 : online database – version 1.0 – Senckenberg Deutsches Entomologisches Institut. Bibliography

German entomologists
Fellows of the Royal Society
People from Royal Prussia
German people in the Polish–Lithuanian Commonwealth
Scientists from Gdańsk
1680 births
1764 deaths
18th-century German people